Sayaji Rao Gaekwad II was the eight Maharaja of Baroda State reigning from 1819 to 1847. He became Maharaja of Baroda after the death of Anand Rao Gaekwad. He was the third son of Govind Rao Gaekwad.

Succession
He died in 1847 and was succeeded by Ganpat Rao Gaekwad as the new Maharaja of Baroda state.

See also
Gaekwad dynasty

References

External links
 Official Website of the Gaekwads of Baroda

1800 births
1847 deaths
Maharajas of Vadodara
Hindu monarchs
Indian royalty
Indian military leaders